Prichotilus bidens is a moth of the family Pterophoridae. It is known from the Khasi Hills of India.

The wingspan is 10–11 mm.

References

Pterophoridae
Moths of Asia